Montréal-la-Cluse is a commune in the Ain department in eastern France. It is located in the historical region of Bugey and its inhabitants are known as the Montréalais.

Transport
The town lies on the Haut Bugey railway line and a branch line to Oyonnax. Brion—Montréal-la-Cluse station has rail connections to Bourg-en-Bresse and Oyonnax.

Population

See also
Communes of the Ain department

References

External links

 Official website

Communes of Ain
Ain communes articles needing translation from French Wikipedia